Metpally is a town and Revenue Division and third largest town in Jagtial district of the Indian state of Telangana.  It is located 222 km away from state capital Hyderabad, 67 km from Nizamabad, 80 km from Karimnagar and 33 km far away from District Headquarter Jagtial. It have great history many Dynasties ruled including Sathavahana's and Kakatiya's. The Kakatiyas built a temple named Chennakesava.

Government and politics 
Metpally is in the Jagtial district. Metpally Municipality was constituted in 2005 and is classified as a third-grade municipality with 24 election wards. Metpally was once a thaluk and constituency for several years.

Economy 

The main occupation of the people surrounding this town is agriculture. A variety of crops are grown, including MAIZE, turmeric, Paddy, soya, gingelly, castor, moong dal and groundnuts.

Temples  
There are several historical temples in Metpally. 
 ISKCON Metpally, Hare Krishna Temple
 Kashi bagh Temple complex including the Hanuman, Shiva and Dattatreya Swamy temples.
 Chenna Keshavaswamy temple dating back to the 13th century. 
 Omkareshwara temple
 Narasimha Swami temple
 Ramalayam in SRSP camp 
 Vasavi kanyaka parameshwari temple
Abhayastha hanuman temple-Vellulla road
Ayyappa swamy temple
Markhandeya Temple
Krishna Mandiram
Sai Baba Temple-Near Railway Station
Venkateshwara Temple-near Old Bustand
Veera bramhamgari temple Dubbawada
Gol Hanuman temple, Dubbawada
Mahalaxmi temple near Vatti vaagu is the oldest & most believed temple by Metpally people.
Bhudevi temple, located at Chavidi circle, is the 1st temple in Metpally.
Tri Shakti Devalayam, besides ISKCON Hare Krishna Temple

Entertainment 
Movie theatres are 
 Asian Sai Krishna
 Laxmi A/C Theatre
 RajaKala Mandir
 Venkatesh Theatre

References 

Mandal headquarters in Jagtial district